Joe Bageant (1946–2011) (pronounced "bay-gent") was an American author and columnist. He was best known for his 2007 book, Deer Hunting With Jesus: Dispatches From America's Class War.

Early life
As a child Bageant had lived in the insular, hardscrabble farming community of Unger, West Virginia and later just over the state line in the town of Winchester, Virginia and attended John Handley High School there. His teachers told him that he wasn’t cut out for college, and his parents pressured him to work from an early age. Bageant quit school, joined the navy, and got married. He was discharged in the 1960s. He bought an old school bus and headed for San Francisco. En route, the bus broke down in Boulder, Colorado. Bageant and his young family lived there, sometimes on the bus, for several years, before moving to an Indian reservation in Idaho. During that time, Bageant worked at blue collar jobs until, in the mid-1970s, he broke his back and had to lie flat for months while he recuperated. It was then that he started honing his writing skills, using his convalescence to perfect a prose style that would, over the years, acquire a cult following.

In 2001, Bageant moved back to Winchester.

Progressive author
In Deer Hunting With Jesus, Bageant discusses how the Democratic Party lost the political support of poor rural whites and how the Republican Party has convinced them to "vote against their own economic self-interest." The book is mainly centered on his hometown, Winchester.

In 2010, Bageant published a similarly themed book, Rainbow Pie: A Redneck Memoir. Bageant used his extended family's experience after World War II to describe the social hierarchy in the United States. The book examines the postwar journey of 22 million rural Americans into the cities, where they became, the author argues, the foundation of a permanent white underclass and comprise much of today's heartland red state voters.

Bageant frequently appeared as a commentator on radio and television internationally and wrote a progressive online column distributed to hundreds of blogs and websites. He maintained his own blog joebageant.net, assisted by Ken Smith, who continued editing the blog after Bageant's death. Bageant also served as a senior (roving) editor for Cyrano's Journal Today and The Greanville Post, two sites devoted to progressive political and media analyses.

Later life
During the last years of his life, Bageant lived in Ajijic, a small town on Lake Chapala in central Mexico. He had been living in Ajijic, where he wrote Rainbow Pie, when he learned that he had a fast-growing and inoperable cancer.

On January 4, 2011, Bageant announced on his web site that he had been "struck down by an extremely serious form of cancer" that was inoperable and so he was unable to engage in correspondence or his usual work, but he hoped to be able to resume them in the future.

On March 27, 2011, it was announced on his website that Bageant had died on March 26 following "a vibrant life" and a four-month struggle with cancer.

Legacy
After Bageant's death, his Australian publisher asked Bageant's literary executor, Ken Smith, to select and edit about 80,000 words of his essays. The book was published in November 2011 as Waltzing at the Doomsday Ball: The Best of Joe Bageant. This posthumous collection was available only in Australia, New Zealand, and South Africa where, according to Smith, it sold reasonably well. According to Smith, "no American publisher is yet interested in a book by a redneck socialist—and that says a lot about American culture and the US book business."

Bageant's friends at The Greanville Post voted him as editor emeritus of the publication.

Works

References

External links
 Joe Bageant
 "Why rednecks may rule the world" by Joe Bageant, BBC Today, 6 September 2008
 Waltzing at the Doomsday Ball: Capitalism is dead, but we still dance with the corpse" by Joe Bageant, The Greanville Post, July 9, 2010
 The Fearless Plain by Joe Bageant, The Greanville Post, May 21, 2010
 Joe Bageant Podcast: Interview from September 2009

1946 births
2011 deaths
People from Winchester, Virginia
American political writers
American male non-fiction writers
American socialists
Virginia socialists
People from Ajijic
Historians from Virginia